Giorgos Pelagias  (born May 10, 1985 in Nicosia) is a Cypriot footballer, who last played for ASIL Lysi.

Career
Pelagias joined Kerkyra in July 2006 where he signed a 4-year contract.

On 1 August 2013 Pelagias joined Azerbaijan Premier League side FK Baku.

Pelagias joined ASIL Lysi in August 2018. He left the club again at the end of the season.

Career statistics

References

External links
  Player profile at aokerkyra.com
 

1985 births
Living people
Association football defenders
Cypriot footballers
Cyprus international footballers
Cypriot expatriate footballers
Olympiakos Nicosia players
A.O. Kerkyra players
Atletico Roma F.C. players
A.S.D. Barletta 1922 players
FK Riteriai players
Apollon Limassol FC players
ASIL Lysi players
A Lyga players
Cypriot First Division players
Expatriate footballers in Greece
Expatriate footballers in Italy
Sportspeople from Nicosia